Arctic Velvet is a range of products from the company ThoCon AG based in Cham, Switzerland. The product range consists of Whisky, Gin, Vodka and Aquavit Aqua vitae. These products' specialty is that they are produced with water from Greenland. All the products are distilled five times or more.

The artesian well is based in Qeqertarsuaq in the western part of Greenland and is approximately 2000 years old. It originates from a volcanic stone and its water has a PH-value of 9.38. It is naturally alkaline, which makes it very smooth and has a value of under 1 degree on the German scale of water hardness [dH].

The government has signed a contract in 2006 allowing Greenland Spring Water (the water supplier of Arctic Velvet) to export mineral water from Qeqertarsuaq. They investigated three years to assess the commercial possibilities of selling Greenlandic water products internationally. Since August 2008 the contract with the government to export water from Greenland is in place. The economy of Greenland expects to create new jobs in Qeqertarsuaq.

References
 Article about Arctic-Velvet and the production National Newspaper of Greenland, Sermitsiaq Issue-Nr. 39, 2010
 Article about Greenland Springwater, National Newspaper of Greenland, Sermitsiaq 29 October 2009
 Article about Greenland Springwater

External links
 greenland.com

Swiss distilled drinks